Nikolaos Tsitiridis is a Bulgarian comedian, writer, screenwriter and television presenter.

He is known for his stand-up performances at The Comedy Club Sofia, as well as the host of The Nikolaos Tsitiridis Show on bTV.

Biography 
Nikolaos-Theodoros Ilias Tsitiridis was born on February 1, 1994, in Athens, Greece. His father is Greek and his mother is Bulgarian from Blagoevgrad. At the age of 5, he came to Bulgaria with his mother. In 2009 he started playing drums and founded his first band.

He completed his primary education in 6 elementary schools and secondary education in 32 secondary schools.

He studied journalism at the Faculty of Journalism and Mass Communication at Sofia University "St. Kliment Ohridski". He works on his specialty at Offnews. For his work in the media, he won the "Valya Krushkina – journalism for the people" award.

Career 
Since 2016, he has been part of The Comedy Club Sofia. He began his career as a comedian on the Open Mic show at The Comedy Club Sofia. After less than a year, he signed a contract with club manager Ivan Kirkov and became a professional stand-up comedian. Since May 16, 2019, he has been a resident – ​​the highest title for special achievements in comedy in Bulgaria. He also participates in The Comedy Club News podcast (show on YouTube), where every week he discusses the week together with Ivan Kirkov and Alexander Deyanski.

From January 27, 2020, he is the host of The Nikolaos Tsitiridis Show on bTV.

In 2022, he is a jury member of the eighth season of Balgariya tarsi talant.

In the same year, he voiced in the bulgarian dubbing of the animated film Minions: The Rise of Gru, recorded in the studio "Alexandra Audio" with the role of Jean-Crab, originally voiced by Jean-Claude Van Damme. This is his only dub appearance.

References 

1994 births
Bulgarian comedians
Bulgarian television presenters
Bulgarian male voice actors
Sofia University alumni
People from Athens
Bulgarian people of Greek descent
Living people